Aurantimycin A is an depsipeptide antibiotic with the molecular formula C38H64N8O14. Aurantimycin A is produced by the bacterium Streptomyces aurantiacus. Aurantimycin A also show cytotoxic properties.

References

Further reading 

 
 
 

Antibiotics
Depsipeptides
Cyclic peptides